Colonel Joan Burton is a fictional character from the Lifetime television series Army Wives, portrayed by Wendy Davis.

Fictional biography
Joan is a native of the projects of South Side, Chicago. She once stated that her classmates in high school were all either doing drugs or getting pregnant. In Season 6, she tells Roland that she briefly experimented with marijuana in high school and that one of her good friends moved on to heroin and ended up dying of overdose. A coach at her school spotted her athletic potential and track became her outlet and a way out of her impoverished background. She attended college on an Army ROTC scholarship and joined the army.

Joan is married to Dr. Roland Burton (Sterling K. Brown), which makes Roland the lone "Army husband" among the main characters.  After returning from deployment in Season 1, Joan struggles with PTSD resulting from her experiences while deployed. Her relationship with Roland suffers, and he has a one-night stand with a visiting reporter due to his feelings of alienation and dissatisfaction.  He confesses to Joan when she returns from abroad, leading talk of divorce.  But the two reconcile following her announcement that she is pregnant and the explosion at the Hump Bar.

Season 2 deals with Joan's pregnancy, and her daughter, Sara Elizabeth, is born at the end of the Season. Sara Elizabeth celebrates her first birthday in Season 4.  Sara Elizabeth's godparents are Claudia Joy and General Michael Holden. She and Roland adopt David in Season 5 and his adoption is finalized in the Season 6 premiere.

Career
In the pilot episode Joan is introduced as a lieutenant colonel who returns from Afghanistan after nearly two years. Her career nearly ends with an Article 15 after a decision she makes causes one of her soldiers with PTSD to hold her husband Roland and Claudia Joy Holden hostage. She considers retiring to avoid a court martial and her career ending in disgrace, but Colonel Michael Holden changes his mind when she voluntarily separates herself from the army for a month to seek treatment at a VA clinic in Vermont for her PTSD. Throughout the first season, she struggles to cope with events that occurred while she was deployed, eventually leaving for a treatment facility. During the Season 1 finale, she discovers she is pregnant.

The branch insignia on her service uniform indicates that she is an intelligence officer. She previously served as Michael's G-2 (
When the post commander Brigadier General Baker suffered a brain aneurysm, Michael is promoted to brigadier general and made post commander. He offers her the position as his executive officer (i.e. second in command), which she accepts. During this time, she hides her pregnancy while deciding whether or not to keep the baby. She has a change of heart when at the clinic to terminate her pregnancy and confesses to Roland that the thought of him and how he would make a great father drove her to change her mind about keeping the baby. When she finally confesses that she is pregnant, General Holden hires LTC Evan Connor to cover for her while she is on maternity leave. Connor tries to undermine her with every opportunity and even uses SPC Trevor LeBlanc, who was working as her assistant while recuperating from his injury, to get back at her indirectly.

In the Season 2 finale, "Last Minute Changes," General Holden has received a transfer. His replacement, General Rutledge, is old friends with Connor. He tells Joan that Connor will be replacing her as deputy garrison commander and she will be deployed to Iraq. In the first episode of Season 3, she is told she will be leaving with her new unit in three months.

While awaiting deployment, Joan continues to have run-ins with Connor. General Holden receives a promotion and is transferred back to the post as division commander. General Rutledge is transferred to the Pentagon while Connor remains on post. After settling back in, Holden asks Joan to take the position of his assistant. However, she declines, having come to the decision that her place is serving as brigade commander in Iraq. She sees herself as a combat officer. Holden is surprised by her decision but also admires it.

In the episode "Post and Prejudice" Connor is pitted against Joan in the annual war games and is soundly defeated even though he made use of one of her staff to leak information to his side. At the end of the episode Connor is transferred to a desk job in logistics at the Pentagon at General Holden's request.

Joan's decision to deploy even though a job on post was available causes much tension with Roland, but eventually he comes to accept her career choice. She deploys late in Season 3.

In the Season 3 finale, she suffers an eye injury after her convoy comes under attack and she is struck by shrapnel when an RPG hits nearby. She recovers well after surgery in Germany and plans to return to her unit. However, General Holden calls to say he has nominated her for a prestigious temporary assignment with a task force rebuilding schools in Iraq. It's not a battlefield command, but it's an important high-profile assignment and will be good for her career. On arrival she finds the project behind schedule and over budget and employs diplomacy and organizational skills to work with the local contractor and get things back on track. There are some complications, but eventually she hires a new contractor and completes the project successfully. When her division is recalled, she returns to Fort Marshall to await her next combat deployment.

Upon her return to Fort Marshall in Season 4, Roland notice small lapses in function, like putting her clothes in the wrong closet and loss of balance. Eventually she is diagnosed with Traumatic Brain Injury likely from the prior RPG attack. She was placed on convalescent leave and did not redeploy with the division.

In the Season 5 premiere she was notified of her promotion to the rank of colonel and also received the additional duty of garrison commander. At the end of the series, she is initially offered admission to the Army's War College and by extension the possibility of promotion to General. This plan is cancelled and Joan opts to retire from the Army when Roland delivers an ultimatum that if accepts admission to the War College; their marriage will end as he has put his dreams and ambitions on hold, in large part, to accommodate Joan's career.

Awards and decorations
The following are the medals and service awards fictionally worn by Colonel Burton.

Reception
Reviewing the show's second season, Patrick Luce of Monsters and Critics enjoyed Joan's pregnancy storyline, writing: "Davis’ character is so professional military that it was comic gold to see her going through the various changes that come with pregnancy, and the aftermath of having a baby. You can’t help but crack up watching the sleep-deprived Roland and Joan trying to function like before they had a baby. Working Moms praised the character in a 2010 article, defining the character as a working mom balancing a military career with marriage and a newborn baby, and adding, "She defied expectations and became Fort Marshall's first African American female lieutenant colonel."

Wendy Davis has also received three NAACP Image Award nominations for her portrayal of Joan Burton under the category of "Outstanding Actress in a Drama Series" in 2008, 2009, and 2011.

References

External links
 Joan Burton at Lifetime
 Joan Burton on IMDb

Army Wives characters
Fictional African-American people
Fictional characters from Chicago
Television characters introduced in 2007
Fictional United States Army personnel
Fictional colonels
Fictional Iraq War veterans
Fictional War in Afghanistan (2001–2021) veterans